The Selangor pygmy flying squirrel (Petaurillus kinlochii) is a species of rodent in the family Sciuridae. It is endemic to Malaysia where it has only been found in the State of Selangor.

References

Rodents of Malaysia
Petaurillus
Endemic fauna of Selangor
Mammals described in 1911
Taxonomy articles created by Polbot